Joseph Soosemea Taufetee (born October 4, 1992) is an American rugby union player who plays as a hooker and prop for Leicester Tigers in England's Premiership Rugby.  He previously played for LA Giltinis in Major League Rugby, Lyon OU in France's Top 14 , Worcester Warriors also in Premiership Rugby and the San Diego Breakers in PRO Rugby. He also plays for the United States national team. A converted American football player, Taufetee has also previously represented the United States by serving as captain of the USA Selects.

Early life
Joe Taufetee was born on October 4, 1992 in Nu'uuli, American Samoa and raised in the San Francisco Bay Area after moving with his family to California at the age of five. Of Samoan descent, Taufetee played American football as a youth and aspired to playing in the NFL. Taufetee attended Santa Ana College in Santa Ana, California and played at defensive tackle for school's football team during the 2010 and 2011 seasons. Taufetee earned multiple All-Conference honors during his time with the team, but an ACL injury ended his aspirations of furthering his career in football.

Rugby career

Club
Taufete'e began playing rugby with the Belmont Shore U-19 team while studying and playing American football at Santa Ana Community College. He then went to New Zealand to develop his rugby skills. 

In early 2016, Taufete'e was signed to a professional contract by the San Diego Breakers. In December 2016, Taufete'e signed a contract to the Worcester Warriors in the English Premiership.

On 26 February 2020, Taufete signed for French side Lyon in the Top 14 ahead of the 2020–21 season. In March 2022, following the birth of his child in California, Taufete’e was granted release from Lyon and was subsequently signed by the LA Giltinis.

In August 2022 Taufete'e signed for Leicester Tigers in England's Premiership Rugby. Head coach Steve Borthwick described Taufete'e as "a powerful player, in attack and defence". He made his debut on 18 September 2022 as a replacement in a 36-21 win over Newcastle Falcons at Welford Road.

International
The uncapped Taufete'e was a surprise inclusion in the U.S. squad for the 2015 Rugby World Cup. Taufete'e debuted for the United States at the 2015 Rugby World Cup against South Africa. He also played for the U.S. at the 2016, 2017, and 2019 Americas Rugby Championships. The USA star has made 22 appearances for the Eagles, scoring 20 tries. This surpasses former Ireland great Keith Wood, a hooker, for the most international tries by any player in the tight five (i.e., either a hooker, prop, or lock).

International tries

References

1992 births
Living people
American rugby union players
American expatriates in England
United States international rugby union players
Rugby union props
Rugby union hookers
San Diego Breakers players
Worcester Warriors players
American football defensive tackles
People from Nu'uuli
Players of American football from American Samoa
American people of Samoan descent
Lyon OU players
LA Giltinis players
Leicester Tigers players